Sarnakhavab-e Sofla (also Romanized as Sarnakhavāb-e Soflá) is a village in Doruneh Rural District, Anabad District, Bardaskan County, Razavi Khorasan Province, Iran. At the 2006 census, its population was 51, in 12 families.

References 

Populated places in Bardaskan County